Abbas Ansari (born 12 February 1992) is an Indian politician and sport shooter, in shotgun shooting. Abbas has won gold medals in national shooting competitions. He is the elder son of deadliest criminal turn politician Mukhtar Ansari who is the former MLA from Mau. Abbas Ansari won the 2022 Uttar Pradesh Legislative Assembly election from Mau representing Suheldev Bharatiya Samaj Party. 

Abbas is a three-time national champion in shooting and has accompanied the Indian team in many international events.

Background
Abbas Ansari is the great-grandson of Dr. Mukhtar Ahmed Ansari who was an Indian nationalist and political leader, and former president of the Indian National Congress and the Muslim League during the Indian Independence Movement. One of the founders of the Jamia Millia Islamia University he remained its Chancellor from 1928 to 1936.

Abbas's father Mukhtar Ansari is a known criminal turned politician, uncle Afzal Ansari and Sibgatullah Ansari have been very active in Indian politics and have held various positions in the Uttar Pradesh Legislative Assembly.

References

1992 births
Living people
Indian male sport shooters
21st-century Indian Muslims
Bahujan Samaj Party politicians from Uttar Pradesh
Leaders of political parties in India
People from Ghazipur
Uttar Pradesh MLAs 2022–2027
21st-century Indian people